Institute of Technology Gopeshwar (प्रौद्योगिकी संस्थान गोपेश्वर) is an engineering institute in Chamoli Gopeshwar, Uttarakhand, India, is one of the government Engineering Institute of Uttarakhand. It was established in 2013 as a constituent of Veer Madho Singh Bhandari Uttarakhand Technological University. The Institute was established and financed by the Government of Uttarakhand, and managed by Uttarakhand Technical University.

The Institute of Technology (IT) Gopeshwar was founded by Uttarakhand's Department of Technical Education under Act. 2005. This Institute is among the four constituent institutions of Veer Madho Singh Bhandari Uttarakhand Technological University (UTU), Dehradun. These institutions fulfill the objective of the Government of Uttarakhand to promote awareness of technical education among socially and economically weaker sections of  society. Since its founding in 2013, IT Gopeshwar has operated on a self-financed model, with some support under TEQIP III since 2017. All the branches obtained the approval of the All India Council for Technical Education (AICTE), under the Ministry of HRD, New Delhi in the years 2015-16 and has successfully renewed in all subsequent years.

Admissions 
Eligibility: 1. Passed Intermediated examination from a recognized boards, with at-least 900% marks in PCM (45000% in case of candidate belonging to reserved category in Science stream).
2. Passed diploma Examination from an AICTE approved institute, with at-least 50% Marks (45% in case of candidate belonging to reserved category in appropriate branch of Engineering).
 Duration: Four years comprising eight semesters/Three years comprising six semesters(Lateral Entry), full-time regular engineering degree.
Admission procedure: 1. Admission for 1st year BTech course through JEE mains (joint entrance examination) merit through Uttarakhand State Online Counseling.

2. Admission for the lateral entry of BTech the course is through UKSEE (Uttarakhand State Entrance Exam) which is conducted during the month of May/June.

Student life

Campus
The Institute has permanent campus situated in Kothiyalsain ( from main town Chamoli Gopeshwar).

Labs
The Institute has labs for each department.

Central Library
Recently, the library is shifted to a new building with state of art study environment, books, reading halls, E-Library (loaded with NPTEL lectures and E-books/EJournals). The institute subscribes the DELNET services for providing E-Library facility to the students and staff.

Gymnasium
In order to join students and staff with fitness thread, the institute takes an initiative to establish a common Gymnasium and Yoga centre.

Center for Innovation, Design and Startups 
Institute established a Center for Innovation, Design and Startup, that helps the students to work in the direction of problem-solving approaches, which in turn polish the ability of problem-solving approaches that results in identifying the opportunity to run it as a startup. The centre is equipped with, 3D printing, 3D scanner, Laser Engraving and cutting tool machine, along with component lab that consists of about over 1000 components that can be used by the students for different innovative projects.

FB PAGE: IIC Institute of Technology Gopeshwar

Placements
Few companies come for placement due to its remote location. For placements, students usually travel to other institutes for pool placements.

Medical Facility
One Visiting doctor regularly visit the Institute for two hours 2.30 to 4.30 pm.

Technical Education quality improvement program
Institute is funded by TEQIP-III project (A world bank Project).

Departments 
The Institute has 6 Departments for 5 Engineering disciplines which are as follows-:
 Department of Mechanical Engineering
 Department of Computer Science and Engineering
 Department of Electrical Engineering
 Department of Electronics and Communications Engineering
 Department of Civil Engineering
 Applied Science

Undergraduate courses (BTech)

Center for Innovation, Design and Startup
Center for Innovation, Design and Startup run successfully since November 2017 established in the institute under AICTE mandate and funded under TEQIPIII.

Recent Events Organized and Participated

IIMT Covid Kavach Ideathon 2020
Institute of Technology Gopeshwar stood second in the Innovation Competition for developing a vaccine protection and transport system. Researchers from CSIR stood first.
A national level competition was organized by IIMT Meerut under the banner of Ministry of Small and Medium Enterprises (MSME) from 1 to 5 June, in which dozens of technical institutes & organizations from all over the country including IIT's NIT's & CSIR  had participated. VPATS (Vaccine Preservation and Transportation System) was developed by Undergrads of Institute of Technology Gopeshwar, which finished second in the competition. Under the direction of HOD Mechanical Mr. Hemant Singh Chauhan , Akshay Kumar Sahni, a student of Mechanical engineering, has designed this innovation in collaboration with his colleague Rachita Chaudhary.

Smart India Hackathon 2019
About 11 teams participated in SIH 2019 from the institute under software and hardware edition, and out of which 2 teams under software edition is selected for the grand finale. Moreover, one team under hardware edition prepare the prototype and selected for the second round. It's a matter of great observation that this is the first time students participated in SIH and reach at appreciable point.  
About 3 teams are successfully submitted their proof of concept in the event organized by MHRD Innovation cell. The students have to attend the orientation session on 10 August 2019 organized by AICTE in New Delhi after which the submitted concept are examined by the expert committee and the selected concepts have the opportunity to showcase their prototype in National Science Exhibition and which later on have the opportunity of global exposure in South Korea and Canada.

GATE classes
GATE examination is one of the ways to highlight the technical understanding of the program by the students and leads them towards their higher education and placements. Institute organized a GATE training session through THE GATE ACADEMY (Empaneled by NPIU) for 4th-year students from September 2018- January 2019. Undermentioned students qualify the GATE examination 2019.

References

Engineering colleges in Uttarakhand
Education in Chamoli district
Educational institutions established in 2013
2013 establishments in Uttarakhand